WNTK-FM (99.7 MHz) is a commercial radio station broadcasting a news/talk radio format. Licensed to New London, New Hampshire, the station serves the Lebanon-Hanover-White River Junction area of New Hampshire and Vermont. The station is currently owned by Robert and John Landry, through licensee Sugar River Media, LLC, and features local morning programs, as well as nationally syndicated conservative talk shows.  Much of the programming is also simulcast on co-owned WUVR 1490 AM and its FM translator at 98.9 MHz in Lebanon, New Hampshire.

Programming
Weekdays begin with a local wake up news and information show. Award-winning New Hampshire broadcaster Peter St. James and Jeanne Lester anchor the 8-10AM slot Monday through Thursday. Afternoons feature two Boston-based shows, Grace Curley and Howie Carr.  The rest of the schedule comes from national hosts from the Westwood One network:  Chris Plante, Mark Levin, Jim Bohannon, "Red Eye Radio" and "America in the Morning."

Weekends feature shows on money, health, home repair, cars, the law, travel, the outdoors, gardening, guns and pets.  Weekend syndicated hosts include Dan Bongino, Ben Shapiro, Bruce DuMont and Bill Cunningham.  The station carries Boston Red Sox baseball.  Most hours begin with updates from Fox News Radio.

History
The station was assigned the call sign WRJE on October 9, 1992, and went on the air November 28.

On December 28, 1992, the station changed its call sign to WNTK-FM. It was carried on WCNL (then known as WNTK, on 1010 AM) before WCNL changed to its current country music format.

References

External links

NTK-FM
Radio stations established in 1993
News and talk radio stations in the United States
Merrimack County, New Hampshire
1993 establishments in New Hampshire